Meprylcaine (also known as Epirocaine and Oracaine) is a local anesthetic with stimulant properties that is structurally related to dimethocaine.

Meprylcaine has a relatively potent inhibitory action on the monoamine transporter and inhibits the reuptake of dopamine, norepinephrine and serotonin.

Synthesis

The 2-methyl-2-(propylamino)propan-1-ol [55968-10-0] (1) is treated with base and then with Benzoyl chloride (2), completing the synthesis of Meprycaine (3).

References 

Local anesthetics
Benzoate esters
Serotonin–norepinephrine–dopamine reuptake inhibitors
Stimulants